These 368 species belong to Paussus, a genus of ground beetles in the family Carabidae.

Paussus species

 Paussus abditus Nagel, 2018
 Paussus acuminicoxis Kolbe, 1896
 Paussus adamsoni Fowler, 1912
 Paussus adeptus Kolbe, 1929
 Paussus adinventus C.A.Dohrn, 1888
 Paussus adjunctus Reichensperger, 1936
 Paussus aenigma Reichensperger, 1954
 Paussus aethiops Blanchard, 1845
 Paussus affinis Westwood, 1833
 Paussus affulgens Reichensperger, 1954
 Paussus afraequatorialis Luna de Carvalho, 1963
 Paussus africanus Luna de Carvalho, 1958
 Paussus afzelii Westwood, 1855
 Paussus aldrovandii Gestro, 1901
 Paussus alienus Reichensperger, 1950
 Paussus alluaudi Reichensperger, 1936
 Paussus ambiguus Reichensperger, 1938
 Paussus americanus Kolbe, 1920
 Paussus andreae Ritsema, 1879
 Paussus angustulus Wasmann, 1922
 Paussus antinorii Gestro, 1881
 Paussus anxius Reichensperger, 1913
 Paussus arabicus Raffray, 1885
 Paussus araneans Luna de Carvalho, 1968
 Paussus arduus Péringuey, 1896
 Paussus aristoteli J.Thomson, 1858
 Paussus armatus Westwood, 1833
 Paussus armicollis Fairmaire, 1899
 Paussus asperulus Fairmaire, 1898
 Paussus assmuthi Wasmann, 1904
 Paussus atheruri Luna de Carvalho, 1960
 Paussus audouinii Westwood, 1852
 Paussus aureofimbriatus Wasmann, 1904
 Paussus aureovellus Reichensperger, 1922
 Paussus avunculus Reichensperger, 1925
 Paussus barkeri Péringuey, 1896
 Paussus basilewskyi Reichensperger, 1952
 Paussus bastinae Luna de Carvalho, 1963
 Paussus batillarius Reichensperger, 1933
 Paussus bayonii Gestro, 1910
 Paussus bekilyanus Jeannel, 1946
 Paussus benoiti Janssens, 1956
 Paussus bicolor Raffray, 1886
 Paussus bicoloricornis Luna de Carvalho, 1963
 Paussus bicornis Wasmann, 1904
 Paussus biflagellatus Luna de Carvalho, 1973
 Paussus bituberculatus Kolbe, 1896
 Paussus blanchardi (Raffray, 1882)
 Paussus bohemani Westwood, 1855
 Paussus borneensis Gestro, 1919
 Paussus bowringii Westwood, 1850
 Paussus boysii Westwood, 1845
 Paussus brancuccii Nagel, 2016
 Paussus braunsi Péringuey, 1897
 Paussus brevicornutus Luna de Carvalho, 1968
 Paussus brincki Reichensperger, 1958
 Paussus brittoni Reichensperger, 1957
 Paussus bucephalus Gyllenhal, 1817
 Paussus buettikeri Nagel, 2006
 Paussus burchelianus Westwood, 1869
 Paussus burgeoni Reichensperger, 1925
 Paussus burmeisteri Westwood, 1838
 Paussus camaxilensis Luna de Carvalho, 1963
 Paussus canaliculatus Wasmann, 1919
 Paussus canteloubei Luna de Carvalho, 1962
 Paussus capillaceus Reichensperger, 1937
 Paussus capreolus Reichensperger, 1913
 Paussus cardoni Wasmann, 1904
 Paussus caroli (Reichensperger, 1913)
 Paussus catalai Jeannel, 1946
 Paussus catoxanthus Gestro, 1923
 Paussus celisi Janssens, 1956
 Paussus centurio C.A.Dohrn, 1881
 Paussus cephalotes Raffray, 1885
 Paussus cerambyx Wasmann, 1904
 Paussus ceratoderinus Luna de Carvalho, 1963
 Paussus cervinus Kraatz, 1892
 Paussus chappuisi Reichensperger, 1938
 Paussus cilipes Westwood, 1845
 Paussus cirenaicus A.Fiori, 1914
 Paussus citernii Gestro, 1912
 Paussus clarkei Luna de Carvalho, 1974
 Paussus cochlearius Westwood, 1838
 Paussus cognatus Westwood, 1842
 Paussus colasi (Antoine, 1952)
 Paussus collarti Reichensperger, 1932
 Paussus comptus Péringuey, 1898
 Paussus concinnus Péringuey, 1896
 Paussus conradti Kolbe, 1896
 Paussus cornutus Chevrolat, 1833
 Paussus coronatus Reichensperger, 1935
 Paussus corporaali Reichensperger, 1927
 Paussus crenaticornis Raffray, 1885
 Paussus crepidulae Luna de Carvalho, 1967
 Paussus cridae Gestro, 1917
 Paussus cucullatus Westwood, 1850
 Paussus cultratus Westwood, 1850
 Paussus curtisii Westwood, 1864
 Paussus cuypersi Luna de Carvalho, 1976
 Paussus cyathiger Raffray, 1885
 Paussus cylindricollis Wasmann, 1922
 Paussus cylindricornis Péringuey, 1885
 Paussus dama H.Dohrn, 1890
 Paussus damarinus Westwood, 1874
 Paussus darlingtoni Reichensperger, 1951
 Paussus decellei Luna de Carvalho, 1980
 Paussus decipiens Reichensperger, 1951
 Paussus dedyckeri Luna de Carvalho, 1976
 Paussus degeeri Westwood, 1855
 Paussus denticulatus Westwood, 1845
 Paussus desneuxi Fowler, 1912
 Paussus dichrous Janssens, 1950
 Paussus dissidens Péringuey, 1898
 Paussus dissimulator Reichensperger, 1928
 Paussus distinguendus Reichensperger, 1925
 Paussus dohrnii Westwood, 1852
 Paussus dollmani Wasmann, 1922
 Paussus donisthorpei Wasmann, 1922
 Paussus drescheri Reichensperger, 1935
 Paussus drumonti Maruyama, 2014
 Paussus eisentrauti Nagel, 1982
 Paussus elaphus H.Dohrn, 1890
 Paussus elizabethae Péringuey, 1897
 Paussus elongatus Kano, 1930
 Paussus escherichi Wasmann, 1911
 Paussus excavatus Westwood, 1833
 Paussus exiguus Reichensperger, 1929
 Paussus fairmairei Raffray, 1886
 Paussus fallax Péringuey, 1892
 Paussus favieri Fairmaire, 1851
 Paussus fichtelii Donovan, 1804
 Paussus fissifrons Fairmaire, 1902
 Paussus fletcheri Fowler, 1912
 Paussus formosus Wasmann, 1912
 Paussus foveifrons Reichensperger, 1926
 Paussus fulvus Westwood, 1842
 Paussus gazella Reichensperger, 1925
 Paussus germari Westwood, 1852
 Paussus ghanensis Luna de Carvalho, 1973
 Paussus glabripennis (Jeannel, 1946)
 Paussus globiceps Reichensperger, 1913
 Paussus goetzei Kolbe, 1926
 Paussus gracilis (Reichensperger, 1930)
 Paussus granulatus Westwood, 1850
 Paussus hardwickii Hope, 1831
 Paussus hasinae Maruyama, 2016
 Paussus hearseyanus Westwood, 1842
 Paussus heinrichi Luna de Carvalho, 1959
 Paussus henningsi Reichensperger, 1929
 Paussus hirsutus Raffray, 1886
 Paussus hisamatsui Maruyama & Ito, 2016
 Paussus horikawae Kano, 1930
 Paussus horni Wasmann, 1902
 Paussus hottentotta (Westwood, 1874)
 Paussus howa C.A.Dohrn, 1881
 Paussus huamboensis Schüle & Bednarik, 2015
 Paussus hughscotti Reichensperger, 1938
 Paussus humbloti Raffray, 1886
 Paussus humboldtii Westwood, 1852
 Paussus hystrix Westwood, 1850
 Paussus incultus Reichensperger, 1926
 Paussus inermis Gerstaecker, 1855
 Paussus inexspectatus Fairmaire, 1899
 Paussus intermedius Reichensperger, 1957
 Paussus intuitivus Kolbe, 1935
 Paussus jacobsoni Wasmann, 1928
 Paussus janssensi Luna de Carvalho, 1956
 Paussus javanus Wasmann, 1899
 Paussus jeanneli Reichensperger, 1936
 Paussus jeannelianus Basilewsky, 1957
 Paussus jengi Maruyama, 2016
 Paussus jerdani Westwood, 1847
 Paussus jousselinii Guérin-Méneville, 1836
 Paussus kanaoi Maruyama, 2016
 Paussus kannegieteri Wasmann, 1896
 Paussus kecil Maruyama, 2016
 Paussus kjellanderi Luna de Carvalho, 1965
 Paussus klugii Westwood, 1838
 Paussus kochi Reichensperger, 1953
 Paussus kohli Wasmann, 1907
 Paussus kolbei Reichensperger, 1925
 Paussus komatsui Maruyama, 2016
 Paussus krelli Kaupp & Rödel, 1997
 Paussus kristenseni Reichensperger, 1913
 Paussus lacrimans Reichensperger, 1925
 Paussus laetus Gerstaecker, 1867
 Paussus laevifrons (Westwood, 1833)
 Paussus lamottei Luna de Carvalho, 1968
 Paussus lanxangensis Nagel, 2009
 Paussus laosensis Maruyama & Nagel, 2016
 Paussus laticollis Raffray, 1886
 Paussus latidens Kolbe, 1935
 Paussus latreillei Westwood, 1845
 Paussus leechi Luna de Carvalho, 1968
 Paussus leleupi Luna de Carvalho, 1968
 Paussus leroyi Wasmann, 1899
 Paussus liber Wasmann, 1899
 Paussus lineatus Thunberg, 1781
 Paussus linnaei Westwood, 1833
 Paussus linnavuori Luna de Carvalho, 1969
 Paussus lucasseni Wasmann, 1896
 Paussus ludekingii Snellen van Vollenhoven, 1872
 Paussus lusotropicalis Luna de Carvalho, 1963
 Paussus madurensis Wasmann, 1913
 Paussus malayanus Maruyama, 2016
 Paussus manicanus Péringuey, 1896
 Paussus manni Reichensperger, 1925
 Paussus marshalli Péringuey, 1896
 Paussus masaoi Maruyama, 2014
 Paussus massarti Reichensperger, 1933
 Paussus mata Maruyama, 2016
 Paussus medleri Luna de Carvalho, 1980
 Paussus mendesi (Luna de Carvalho, 2001)
 Paussus microcephalus Linnaeus, 1775
 Paussus milloti Jeannel, 1955
 Paussus milneedwardsi Raffray, 1885
 Paussus mimus Péringuey, 1897
 Paussus minor Shiraki, 1907
 Paussus minutulus Nagel & Rasool, 2019
 Paussus mirei Luna de Carvalho, 1957
 Paussus modestus Reichensperger, 1913
 Paussus moltonii Luna de Carvalho, 1959
 Paussus moreirai Luna de Carvalho, 1971
 Paussus mucius C.A.Dohrn, 1884
 Paussus multisetosus Maruyama, 2016
 Paussus murrayi Westwood, 1857
 Paussus nagahatai Maruyama, 2016
 Paussus nageli Luna de Carvalho, 1980
 Paussus nakasei Maruyama, 2016
 Paussus natalis Péringuey, 1898
 Paussus nauceras Benson, 1846
 Paussus nigrita Wasmann, 1904
 Paussus nobilis Wasmann, 1930
 Paussus nomurai Maruyama, 2016
 Paussus nudus Nagel, 1980
 Paussus oberthueri Wasmann, 1899
 Paussus obscurus Nagel, 1977
 Paussus occlusus Darlington, 1950
 Paussus oertzeni Kolbe, 1896
 Paussus olcesii Fairmaire, 1856
 Paussus opacus Kraatz, 1892
 Paussus orientalis Nagel, 1986
 Paussus overlaeti Reichensperger, 1937
 Paussus pacificus Westwood, 1855
 Paussus pallidefulvus Wasmann, 1899
 Paussus pandamanus Wasmann, 1904
 Paussus passosi Luna de Carvalho, 1963
 Paussus pasteuri Wasmann, 1896
 Paussus patrizii Gestro, 1923
 Paussus paulmuelleri Nagel, 1983
 Paussus penicillatus Raffray, 1886
 Paussus permutatus Reichensperger, 1937
 Paussus perrieri Fairmaire, 1898
 Paussus perroti Wasmann, 1899
 Paussus pierronii Fairmaire, 1880
 Paussus pilicornis Donovan, 1804
 Paussus pilosus Reichensperger, 1957
 Paussus piochardi Saulcy, 1874
 Paussus pipitzi C.A.Dohrn, 1884
 Paussus planicollis Raffray, 1885
 Paussus planicornis Wasmann, 1922
 Paussus planifrons Fairmaire, 1899
 Paussus ploiophorus Benson, 1846
 Paussus politus Westwood, 1850
 Paussus prestesjoannesi Luna de Carvalho, 1974
 Paussus pretoriensis Brauns, 1925
 Paussus procerus Gerstaecker, 1867
 Paussus propinquus Péringuey, 1888
 Paussus pseudocucullatus Nagel, 1983
 Paussus pseudoklugi Luna de Carvalho, 1963
 Paussus pseudosetosus Nagel, 1977
 Paussus quadratidens Wasmann, 1904
 Paussus quadricornis Wasmann, 1899
 Paussus raffrayi Péringuey, 1896
 Paussus rawlinsi Nagel, 2006
 Paussus recorpus Nagel, 1986
 Paussus recticornis Raffray, 1886
 Paussus reductus Reichensperger, 1937
 Paussus reichenspergeri (Luna de Carvalho, 1959)
 Paussus ricardojorgei Luna de Carvalho, 1951
 Paussus ritsemae Wasmann, 1896
 Paussus roeri (Luna de Carvalho, 1989)
 Paussus roslii Maruyama, 2016
 Paussus rougemonti Luna de Carvalho, 1974
 Paussus rougemontianus Lorenz, 1998
 Paussus ruber Thunberg, 1781
 Paussus rufitarsis Westwood, 1833
 Paussus rugiceps Péringuey, 1888
 Paussus rugosus Raffray, 1886
 Paussus rusticus Péringuey, 1885
 Paussus sankuruensis Reichensperger, 1930
 Paussus saundersii Westwood, 1841
 Paussus sauteri Wasmann, 1912
 Paussus scaliger Reichensperger, 1926
 Paussus schaumii Westwood, 1852
 Paussus schiodtii Westwood, 1874
 Paussus schoutedeni Reichensperger, 1933
 Paussus scorteccii Luna de Carvalho, 1959
 Paussus scyphus Raffray, 1886
 Paussus sebakuanus (Péringuey, 1904)
 Paussus semicucullatus Brauns, 1899
 Paussus semilineatus Wasmann, 1899
 Paussus semirufus Wasmann, 1899
 Paussus seriesetosus Wasmann, 1904
 Paussus serraticornis Nagel & Bednarik, 2013
 Paussus serratulus Reichensperger, 1927
 Paussus sesquisulcatus Wasmann, 1899
 Paussus setosus Westwood, 1850
 Paussus sewelli Ribeiro, 1930
 Paussus seydeli Reichensperger, 1937
 Paussus seyriganus Jeannel, 1946
 Paussus seyrigi Reichensperger, 1936
 Paussus shuckardi Westwood, 1838
 Paussus siamensis Maruyama, 2016
 Paussus sicardi Jeannel, 1946
 Paussus signatipennis Péringuey, 1885
 Paussus sikoranus C.A.Dohrn, 1890
 Paussus simplicissimus Janssens, 1956
 Paussus soleatus Wasmann, 1894
 Paussus solidus Reichensperger, 1936
 Paussus somaliae Reichensperger, 1953
 Paussus spencii Westwood, 1864
 Paussus sphaerocerus Afzelius, 1798
 Paussus spiniceps Wasmann, 1904
 Paussus spinicola Wasmann, 1892
 Paussus spinicoxis Westwood, 1850
 Paussus spinolae Gestro, 1901
 Paussus squamicornis Wasmann, 1922
 Paussus stevensianus Westwood, 1842
 Paussus stolzi Kolbe, 1926
 Paussus striaticornis Luna de Carvalho, 1966
 Paussus suahelinus Reichensperger, 1930
 Paussus suavis Wasmann, 1894
 Paussus subarcuatus Reichensperger, 1932
 Paussus subglaber Maruyama, 2016
 Paussus sumateranus Maruyama, 2016
 Paussus tagalicus Gestro, 1919
 Paussus tchadensis Luna de Carvalho, 1957
 Paussus telescopifer Wasmann, 1922
 Paussus tenuiculus Luna de Carvalho, 1959
 Paussus tenuis Reichensperger, 1925
 Paussus testaceus Fowler, 1912
 Paussus thomsonii Reiche, 1860
 Paussus thoracicus Donovan, 1804
 Paussus tibialis Westwood, 1841
 Paussus tigrinus Gestro, 1901
 Paussus tristis Wasmann, 1912
 Paussus tununguensis Reichensperger, 1933
 Paussus turcicus I.Frivaldszky von Frivald, 1835
 Paussus uelensis (Reichensperger, 1925)
 Paussus upembanus Janssens, 1951
 Paussus vadoni Jeannel, 1946
 Paussus vanrooni Wasmann, 1922
 Paussus verticalis Reiche, 1847
 Paussus vexator Péringuey, 1898
 Paussus viator Péringuey, 1896
 Paussus vollenhovii Westwood, 1874
 Paussus wasmanni Kraatz, 1894
 Paussus watarui Maruyama, 2016
 Paussus waterhousei Westwood, 1874
 Paussus wellmani Wasmann, 1907
 Paussus wittei Maruyama, 2016
 Paussus woerdeni Ritsema, 1876
 Paussus wroughtoni Wasmann, 1894
 Paussus yasutoshii Maruyama, 2016
 Paussus ypsilopilos Luna de Carvalho, 1966
 Paussus yubaki Nagel, 2018
 Paussus zhouchaoi Wang, 2017

References

Lists of insect species